Floe is an unincorporated community in Clay County, West Virginia, United States. It was previously known as Walker.

References

Unincorporated communities in West Virginia
Unincorporated communities in Clay County, West Virginia